Biggest village in a Gujarat by size and population.

Gozaria is a town and a gram panchayat in Mehsana district in the Indian state of Gujarat.

Geography and Climate

Geography
It has an average elevation of 81 metres (265 feet) above sea level. It is approximately 60 km away from the city of Ahmedabad and 32 km from Gandhinagar. The area of the Gozaria is around 3 km2 and population in 2001 is 13132.

Climate
Gozaria enjoys all types of weather. In Summer, it's hot and humid with an average temperature of 44 Degrees with hot sandy winds. In Winter, it's 15 degrees and in Monsoon, the average rainfall is about 80 to 90 cm per season.

Transport

Air
The nearest International airport is Sardar Vallabhbhai Patel International Airport at Ahmedabad, located about 60 km away.

Rail
Gozaria has a Railway station, providing connections to Vijapur and Aambaliyasan.

Road
Gozariya highway is connected with three major cities which is Gandhinagar, Mehsana and visnagar. In Gozaria there are three major road Which is. State highway No. 71
 Gozaria−Gandhinagar highway
 Gozaria-Mehsana highway
 Gozaria-visnagar Highway

Demographics
The town comprises several communities. Among these are:
 Kadva Patel
 Rabari
 Prajapati(Kumbhar)
 Soni (caste)
 Brahmin
 Vaniya(shah)
 Rajput/Darbar/Thakur/Vaghela
 Harijan
 Suthar(Mistry)
 Raval (Yogi)
 Valmiki
 Sathvara(Kadia)

Townscape
Gozaria is also green town. Most of people are occupied in agriculture. There are different area where people stay with unique culture called Chowk. In Gozaria village there are many chowk like Bhakt Chowk, Shakti Chowk, Krishna Chowk, Navarang Chowk, Krushn Chowk.

Temples

There are many Temples in Gozaria. Gozaria town has several temples dedicated to Hinduism. The major temple in Gozaria are
 Two Kalika Temple
 Two Shiva Temple
 One Umiya Mataji (ઉમિયા માતાજી) Temple
 One Bahuchar Mata Temple
 Two Hanuman Temple
 One Durga Temple
 One Sadhi Mata Temple
 One Amba Mataji (Gozaria) Temple
 One Ramdevpir (Gozaria) Temple
 One Limbachmata (Gozaria) Temple
 One Open Temple of Bapa Sitaram & Saibaba ((Bapa ni Madhuli))
 Some Interesting Temples in out skirts of this town surrounded by green lush vicinity are Ambaji Temple, Juna Mahakali Temple, Hanuman Temple

Nearby pilgrim place is Samou (3 km) for famous Chhabila Hanuman

Wadi
There are about eight Wadis (where people get together for social functions) in Gozaria town:
Bahucharmata ni Wadi,
Dhaniba Wadi,
Brahmin's Wadi,
Raam Wadi,
Shiv Vadi,
Prajapati Wadi
Vaniya ni vadi,
Manguba wadi are famous in Gozaria.

Hospital
There are many good hospitals, being Pramukh Swami Surgical Hospital, Arogyanidhi hospital, Darsh surgical hospital, Trisha maternity hospital and Sarvajanik Hospital and many more.  Looking to the need of the peoples of Gozaria and surrounding area as there were no Hospitals and  moreover, many poor & backward class people are living here, villagers of Gozaria decided to open a hospital in 1960. The building was constructed  and the hospital was started on 18-05-1960 with the help of donations from all quarters of society. f

School and College
There are Primary school, Secondary school and Higher school in Gozaria.There are one college Called Nima Girls Arts College and one ITI Located in Gozaria.Also Ganpat University Located ab72

Post Office
One Post office located in Gozaria.

Public Library
One Public Library Located in Town. Which has a minor facility. Limited books and newspaper available there like Gujarat Samachar, Divya Bhaskar, Sandesh.

Culture

Festivals

Gozaria enjoys a thriving cultural tradition, being the centre of Gujarati cultural activities and diverse traditions of different ethnic and religious communities. Popular celebrations and observances include Uttarayan—an annual kite-flying day on 14 and 15 January. The nine nights of Navratri are celebrated with people performing Garba—the folk dance of Gujarat—at venues across the city. The festival of lights—Deepavali is celebrated with the lighting of lamps in every house, the decorating the floors with the rangoli and the bursting of firecrackers. Other festivals such as Holi and Ganesh Chaturthi are celebrated with enthusiasm. The annual Rath Yatra procession on the Ashadh-sud-bij date of the Hindu calendar.

Apart from this, Gozaria Follows a tradition from decades of Mahakali Garba on next day of Dashera where from Midnight to 2.30 a.m., thousands of villagers gathers at Tarpoj Area to see this miraculous tradition which is also telecast  live on local TV networks and websites.

Economy

Banking
Many leading banks are located in Gozaria.
 State Bank of India near Sardar patel circle
 Bank of Baroda at Tower umiya mata temple
 Gozaria Nagrik Sahkari Bank at Main bazar
 Bank of India at highway
 Dena Bank At Gozaria to Gandhinagar Highway
 Mehsana District Co-operative Bank at Main Bazaar road
 Mehsana Urban Co-operative Bank at Sardar Patel Circle
There are severalatm available

Agriculture
The major crops produced in district are Sorghum bicolor, Pearl Millet, Groundnut, ajra, Barley, wheat, tal and jowar. Animal husbandry and dairying have played a vital role in the rural economy of Gozaria.

Industry
GIDC Located in Gozaria

Education
There was no British educational system and nobody was educated as per British System in Gozaria till year 1882.

 Gujarati Primary School (grade 1 to 7) was started on date 01-07-1883.
 Gujarati Primary School (grade 1 to 7) for Girls was started on date 03-05-1907.
 To teach English in std. 5 and 6, an English teacher Shri. Shankarlal Chaganlal was recruited in the year 1913 .
 Even our villager Shri. Ramchandra Jamnadas Amin also worked as a teacher in the school in 1913.

In the year 1921 Shri. Ratibhai D. Amin started an English medium school. It was a short lived project and was closed in short span of times. But after few years our committed and educated young villagers established "Gozaria Kelavni Mandal" on 04-06-1937.

In the summer of 1937 Shri. Somabhai and Laljibhai Co. from Surat gave a huge donation and then all villagers of all communities gave whatever they can donate for the school. Thus on 11-06-1937 Shri. Nathudas Gulabdas laid the foundation of English School with great pomp and show and the school was opened. Shri. Ramchandra Jamnadas Amin was the president of the occasion. And from that day onwards the seeds of education were planted and now it has become a tree in the form of educational campus near the railway station.
Here is the list of Schools, Colleges run by Gozaria Kelavni Mandal

Schools
 Shrimati. Madhuben Khodabhai Patel High school, Gozaria(Formally Known Gozaria Highschool, Gozaria)
 Shrimati. Amthaben Shankarlal Jijidas Patel Higher Secondary School, Gozaria
 Shrimati. Amthaben Shankarlal Jijidas Patel balmandir, Gozaria
 Shri Somabhai Dosaldas patel uchchatar Parthmik shala, Gozaria
 Shri Ramanlal Vaijnath Raval Audhyogik talim sanstha, Gozaria
 Shri Gozaria Nagrik Sahakari Bank Higher Secondary Girls School, Gozaria
 Shrimati Jamnaben Kanjibhai Patel Primary School, Gozaria
 Jyotibaen kalidas Patel madhyamik(Secondary) Shikshan Bhavan

Colleges
 Nima Girls Arts College, Gozaria (associated with Hemchandracharya North Gujarat University)
Other
 Shri Chimanbhai Babhaidas Patel Svanirbhar Computer Center (I. T. I)
 Smt. Menabai Amthabhai Patel Computer Centre

References

External links
 Shree Gozaria Vikas Mandal Mumbai

Cities and towns in Mehsana district
Villages in Mehsana district